The 2022 Sydney Tennis Classic was a tennis tournament on the 2022 ATP Tour and 2022 WTA Tour. It was a combined ATP Tour 250 and WTA 500 tournament played on outdoor hard courts in Sydney, New South Wales, Australia. This was the 128th edition of the tournament. The tournament took place at the NSW Tennis Centre from 10 to 15 January 2022.

Champions

Men's singles 

  Aslan Karatsev def.  Andy Murray 6–3, 6–3
It was Karatsev's first singles title of the year and the 3rd, of his career.

Women's singles 

  Paula Badosa def.  Barbora Krejčíková 6–3, 4–6, 7–6(7–4)

Men's doubles 

  John Peers /  Filip Polášek def.  Simone Bolelli /  Fabio Fognini, 7–5, 7–5

Women's doubles 

  Anna Danilina /  Beatriz Haddad Maia def.  Vivian Heisen /  Panna Udvardy 4–6, 7–5, [10–8]

Points and prize money

Point distribution

Prize money 

*per team

ATP singles main-draw entrants

Seeds 

1 Rankings are as of 3 January 2022.

Other entrants 
The following players received wildcard entry into the singles main draw:
  Nick Kyrgios 
  Andy Murray
  Jordan Thompson

The following player received entry as a special exempt:
  Maxime Cressy

The following players received entry from the qualifying draw:
  Sebastián Báez
  Viktor Durasovic
  Christopher O'Connell
  Jiří Veselý

The following players received entry as lucky losers:
  Daniel Altmaier
  Denis Kudla
  Stefano Travaglia

Withdrawals  
Before the tournament
  Roberto Bautista Agut → replaced by  Alexei Popyrin
  Alex de Minaur → replaced by  Miomir Kecmanović
  Taylor Fritz → replaced by  Marcos Giron
  Cristian Garín → replaced by  Adrian Mannarino
  Ilya Ivashka → replaced by  Hugo Gaston
  Filip Krajinović → replaced by  Brandon Nakashima
  Nick Kyrgios → replaced by  Daniel Altmaier
  Kei Nishikori → replaced by  Stefano Travaglia 
  Albert Ramos Viñolas → replaced by  Denis Kudla 
  Dominic Thiem → replaced by  Pedro Martínez
 Retirements
  David Goffin

ATP doubles main-draw entrants

Seeds

 1 Rankings are as of 3 January 2022.

Other entrants
The following pairs received wildcards into the doubles main draw:
  Moerani Bouzige /  Matthew Romios
  Nick Kyrgios /  Michail Pervolarakis

The following pair received entry using a protected ranking:
  Daniel Altmaier /  Andreas Seppi

Withdrawals
Before the tournament
  Simone Bolelli /  Máximo González → replaced by  Simone Bolelli /  Fabio Fognini
  Marco Cecchinato /  Andreas Seppi → replaced by  Daniel Altmaier /  Andreas Seppi
  Marcus Daniell /  Marcelo Demoliner → replaced by  Marcus Daniell /  Denis Kudla
  Oliver Marach /  Jonny O'Mara → replaced by  Fabrice Martin /  Jonny O'Mara

During the tournament
  Marcus Daniell /  Denis Kudla
  Nick Kyrgios /  Michail Pervolarakis
  Nikola Mektić /  Mate Pavić

WTA singles main-draw entrants

Seeds  

1 Rankings are as of 3 January 2022.

Other entrants 
The following players received wildcard entry into the singles main draw:
  Priscilla Hon 
  Astra Sharma

The following players received entry from the qualifying draw:
  Magdalena Fręch
  Beatriz Haddad Maia
  Giuliana Olmos
  Elena-Gabriela Ruse
  Anna Karolína Schmiedlová
  Ena Shibahara

The following players received entry as lucky losers:
  Océane Dodin
  Fiona Ferro

Withdrawals 
Before the tournament
  Ashleigh Barty → replaced by  Fiona Ferro
  Leylah Fernandez → replaced by  Ajla Tomljanović
  Simona Halep → replaced by  Zhang Shuai
  Angelique Kerber → replaced by  Daria Kasatkina
  Anastasia Pavlyuchenkova → replaced by  Ekaterina Alexandrova
  Maria Sakkari → replaced by  Jeļena Ostapenko
  Iga Świątek → replaced by  Océane Dodin

During the tournament
  Elena Rybakina (left thigh injury)

 Retirements
  Ons Jabeur (lower back injury)

WTA doubles main-draw entrants

Seeds 

 1 Rankings are as of 3 January 2022.

Other entrants
The following pairs received wildcards into the doubles main draw:
  Isabella Bozicevic /  Alexandra Osborne
  Michaela Haet /  Lisa Mays

Withdrawals
Before the tournament
  Anna Bondár /  Arantxa Rus → replaced by  Arantxa Rus /  Astra Sharma
  Natela Dzalamidze /  Vera Zvonareva → replaced by  Ekaterina Alexandrova /  Natela Dzalamidze
  Darija Jurak Schreiber /  Andreja Klepač → replaced by  Darija Jurak Schreiber /  Desirae Krawczyk
  Desirae Krawczyk /  Bethanie Mattek-Sands → replaced by  Alison Bai /  Alicia Smith
  Jessica Pegula /  Storm Sanders → replaced by  Vivian Heisen /  Panna Udvardy
  Samantha Stosur /  Zhang Shuai → replaced by  Barbora Krejčíková /  Zhang Shuai

During the tournament
  Alison Bai /  Alicia Smith

References

External links 
 
 ATP tournament Official website
 WTA tournament Official website

 
2022 ATP Tour
2022 WTA Tour
2022 in Australian tennis
2022
January 2022 sports events in Australia